Stenoma ulosema is a moth in the family Depressariidae. It was described by Edward Meyrick in 1930. It is found in Brazil (Rio de Janeiro).

The wingspan is about 17 mm. The forewings are whitish-ochreous with some slight brownish suffusion along the dorsum from near the base to the middle. The stigmata are fuscous, the plical minute, faint and very obliquely beyond the first discal, an additional dot on the lower angle of the cell and a blotch of fuscous apical suffusion covering the middle of veins 2-4. There is also a marginal series of fuscous dots around part of the costa and termen. The hindwings
are whitish, with a streak of thickened brown scales on the upper margin of the cell from towards the base to two-fifths of the wing.

References

Moths described in 1930
Taxa named by Edward Meyrick
Stenoma